Baxt is a surname. Notable people with the surname include:

Bob Baxt (1938–2018),  Australian lawyer 
George Baxt (1923–2003), American screenwriter and author of crime fiction